At least seventeen ships of the French Navy have borne the name Triton:

Ships named Triton 
 , a 30-gun ship of the line 
 , a fireship 
 , a 48-gun ship of the line 
 , a 30-gun fireship, bore the name during her career 
 , a 40 gun ship of the line, bore the name during her career 
 , a 50-gun ship of the line 
 , a 62-gun ship of the line 
 , a 64-gun ship of the line 
 , a 26-gun frigate, bore the name during her career  
 , a transport 
 , a floating battery 
 , a transport 
 , a  launched in 1823 and decommissioned in 1850 
 , a ship of the line transformed into a steamer, bore the name during her career. 
 Triton (1901), a  launched in 1901 and stricken in 1919. 
 , a tug. 
 , a submarine experimentation ship.

Notes and references
Notes

References

Bibliography
 
 

French Navy ship names